St. Mary Cathedral High School is a private, Roman Catholic high school in Gaylord, Michigan.  It is located in the Roman Catholic Diocese of Gaylord. As of 2019, the principal is Jerry Belanger.

History
St. Mary Cathedral School was established in 1894.  A high school was added in 1925.

Athletics 
St. Mary's is a member of the Ski Valley Conference.  The school colors are blue and white.  The following MHSAA sanctioned sports are offered:

Baseball (boys)
Basketball (boys & girls)
Cross country (boys & girls)
Football (boys)
Golf (boys)
Ice hockey (boys)
Softball (girls)
Track and field (boys & girls)
Volleyball (girls)

References

External links

Roman Catholic Diocese of Gaylord
Catholic secondary schools in Michigan
Schools in Otsego County, Michigan
Educational institutions established in 1925
1925 establishments in Michigan